Warren Lawson Beson (November 16, 1923 – October 25, 1959) was an American football player and coach. He played college football at the University of Minnesota in 1942 and from 1945 to 1948. He also played professional football in 1949 for the Baltimore Colts. He later worked as a high school football and baseball coach. From 1956 until his death in 1959, he was the head football coach and athletic director at Carleton College.

Early years
Beson was born in Minneapolis in 1923. He attended West High School in that city, where he was an all-city football player in 1941.

Beson enrolled at the University of Minnesota in the fall of 1942 and played on the school's freshman football team. He enlisted in the military in March 1943 and served for three years, reaching the rank of corporal. He was discharged in February 1946.

Football player
Beson played guard and center on Bernie Bierman's Minnesota teams in 1947 and 1948 and was the captain of the 1948 team. He earned a reputation as an "iron man" due to the extensive minutes per game that he played on both offense and defense. The Gophers offensive line of those years has been called one of the great lines in the history of college football.

In January 1949, Beson signed to play professional football for the Baltimore Colts of the All-America Football Conference. He appeared in three games for the 1949 Colts, none as a starter. He was released by the Colts on September 29, 1949.

Coaching career
Beson started coaching football and baseball at Edina High School in Minnesota in 1951, two years after the school's founding. In the next five years, each sport won three conference championships. His football record was 35–3–2, while in baseball, his teams were 72–12. Beson was inducted into the Edina Hornets Hall of Fame in 2001.

In May 1956, Beson left Edina to become head football coach, athletic director, and associate professor at Carleton College. In his first year, the Knights were tri-champions in the Midwest Collegiate Athletic Conference. Through 1959, Beson's teams were 21–7–2, outscoring opponents by 632–397.

Beson suffered heart attacks in January 1958 and April 1959.  He experienced shortness of breath during an October 1959 football game against Monmouth College, refused to leave the game, and continued coaching from a chair on the sidelines during the second half.  He died early the next morning at age 35.

Head coaching record

College football

References

External links
 

1923 births
1959 deaths
American football centers
American football guards
Baltimore Colts (1947–1950) players
Carleton Knights athletic directors
Carleton Knights football coaches
Minnesota Golden Gophers football players
High school baseball coaches in the United States
High school football coaches in Minnesota
Players of American football from Minneapolis
American military personnel of World War II
American non-commissioned personnel
Sports coaches from Minneapolis
Sports deaths in Minnesota